Philipstown in King's County was a constituency represented in the Irish House of Commons until 1800. The town was later renamed Daingean in 1922.

Members of Parliament

References

Historic constituencies in County Offaly
Constituencies of the Parliament of Ireland (pre-1801)
1800 disestablishments in Ireland
Constituencies disestablished in 1800